Mehdi Rajeh (also Romanized as Mehdī Rajeh) is a village in Kolbad-e Gharbi Rural District, Kolbad District, Galugah County, Mazandaran Province, Iran. At the 2006 census, its population was 2,008, in 481 families.

References 

Populated places in Galugah County